The Jepson Manual is a flora of the vascular plants that are either native to or naturalized in California. Botanists often refer to the book simply as Jepson.  It is produced by the University and Jepson Herbaria, of the University of California, Berkeley. Its second edition is the basis of the online Jepson eFlora.

History
1923: Willis Linn Jepson – Manual of the Flowering Plants of California
1958, 1968: Philip Alexander Munz – A California Flora and Supplement 
1993: James Craig Hickman (editor) – The Jepson Manual, Higher Plants of California (TJM93)
2012: Bruce Gregg Baldwin – The Jepson Manual: Vascular Plants of California, 2nd edition (TJM2)
2010−ongoing: The Jepson Online Interchange for California Floristics − Jepson eFlora (TJM2) – online.

Preceding works
The Jepson Manual also follows Philip A. Munz and David D. Keck in their A California Flora and Supplement of 1958 and 1968.

Like other florae, The Jepson Manual builds upon these prior publications. Except for the number of line drawings, it has more in common with Munz's 1968 book than with Jepson's 1923 book.

Editions
The first edition of The Jepson Manual was published in 1993 as The Jepson Manual: Higher Plants of California (TJM93), and was edited by James C. Hickman.

The second edition was published in 2012, as The Jepson Manual: Vascular Plants of California, Thoroughly Revised and Expanded (TJM2), and was edited by Bruce Gregg Baldwin, Douglas H. Goldman, David John Keil, Robert Patterson, and Thomas James Rosatti. The second edition features 7,601 California plant species, subspecies and varieties.

While the book is named in honor of Jepson, The Jepson Manual is not simply a new edition of Jepson's 1923 book, but a new work which Baldwin calls "the most time-consuming undertaking of my career."

Jepson eFlora
The Jepson eFlora is a taxonomic database that builds on and expands the second edition of The Jepson Manual. It describes itself as "the foremost authority on the native and naturalized vascular plants of California".

See also

List of California native plants
University and Jepson Herbaria

References

External links
  The Jepson Online Interchange for California Floristics − Jepson eFlora – online search engine for taxonomic treatments.
  Jepson eFlora Homepage
 University & Jepson Herbaria Home Page
 Field Books of Willis Linn Jepson

Florae (publication)
.T
Books about California
Botany in North America
Botanists active in California
Natural history of California
.T
.T
1992 non-fiction books
2012 non-fiction books
University of California, Berkeley
1923 non-fiction books
1923 in biology